The Metropolitan Cathedral of St. John the Evangelist also known as the Dagupan Cathedral is located along Burgos Street in Dagupan, Pangasinan It is the cathedral of the Roman Catholic Archdiocese of Lingayen-Dagupan. Its titular head is Archbishop Socrates B. Villegas.

References

External links
 
 Official Website of the Lingayen-Dagupan Archdiocese

Roman Catholic cathedrals in the Philippines
Roman Catholic churches in Pangasinan
Buildings and structures in Dagupan
Roman Catholic churches completed in 1972
20th-century Roman Catholic church buildings in the Philippines
Churches in the Roman Catholic Archdiocese of Lingayen–Dagupan